Pawan Kumar Pandey is an Indian ex-Shiv Sena politician. Pandey is an ex member of the Uttar Pradesh Legislative Assembly from the Akbarpur constituency in Ambedkar Nagar district.

He was among those accused in the Babri Masjid demolition case arising from the destruction of a mosque in December 1992. He is alleged to have been involved in the planning of the demolition of the Babri Masjid under the leadership of  Uma Bharti, Lal Krishna Advani, Ashok Singhal and other members of the Vishva Hindu Parishad. He was elected as an MLA from the Akbarpur (Assembly constituency) during the 1991 Uttar Pradesh Legislative Assembly election on the ticket of Shiv Sena..

Personal life  

His elder brother Rakesh Pandey (politician, born 1952) was Samajwadi Party MLA from Jalalpur and his younger brother Krishna Kumar Pandey alias Kakku Pandey contested a seat at Isoli in Sultanpur district as a Bahujan Samaj Party candidate. His nephew Ritesh Pandey is currently MP from Jalalpur and a member of the Bahujan Samaj Party. His son Prateek Pandey contested a seat at Katehri in 2022 Vidhan Sabha elections of Uttar Pradesh as a Bahujan Samaj Party candidate.

References 

People from Ambedkar Nagar district
Shiv Sena politicians
Apna Dal politicians
Lok Janshakti Party politicians
Bahujan Samaj Party politicians
Members of the Uttar Pradesh Legislative Assembly
Living people
21st-century Indian politicians
Uttar Pradesh politicians
Year of birth missing (living people)